Giacomo Tulli (born 24 October 1987) is an Italian footballer who plays as a forward or winger for  club Imolese on loan from Fidelis Andria.

Career
Born in Fermo, Marche, Tulli started his career at hometown club Fermana. In mid-2006 he left for Sambenedettese along with Filippo Forò, another Marche club. He only able to play 5 times for the first team and also played for San Benedetto's under-20 team as overage player in 2007–08 season. In 2008–09 season Tulli played for Mezzocorona. In his first ever Lega Pro Seconda Divisione (Italian fourth highest level at that time), Tulli scored 12 goals.

Vicenza
At the end of season Sambenedettese went bankrupted ; Tulli was signed by Serie B club Vicenza on a free transfer, along with the re-signing of Stefano Pietribiasi and Marco Zentil. At Vicenza Tulli re-joined Forò. In August 2009 he left for Italian third division club Rimini. The club reached the first round of promotion playoff but lost to Verona. After the season Rimini bankrupted and a new entity was admitted to Serie D.

Cesena (2010–12)
On 30 June 2010 the last day of financial year of Serie A newcomer A.C. Cesena and Vicenza Calcio, Tulli along with Mattia Evangelisti (both former Sambenedettese player) were sold to Cesena in co-ownership deal, for €1.3 million and €450,000 respectively; on the same day Vicenza signed Denis Tonucci and Luca Righini also in co-ownership deal also for €1.3 million and €450,000 respectively. However Tulli was loaned back to Vicenza for two seasons and two youngster Evangelisti and Righini left for Lega Pro teams in 2010–11 and 2011–12 season.

It made Cesena and Vicenza had paper selling profit in 2009–10 season but heavy cost in future season.  Tulli wore no.11 shirt for Vicenza since 2010–11 season.

The four co-ownership deal also renewed in June 2011. On 3 January 2012, the first day of winter transfer window, Tulli was loaned back to third division for Pisa.

Tulli made his debut on 8 January 2012, partnering Raffaele Perna.

Return to Vicenza
After Cesena and Vicenza relegated, in June 2012 Cesena bought back Tonucci for €650,000 and Righini for €225,000; Vicenza also bought back Tulli for €650,000 and Evangelisti for €225,000. Except Tulli who signed a 2-year contract, all other 3 players were signed a 1-year deal. On 12 July 2012 his loan to Pisa was renewed. On 17 July 2013 he received a call-up to Vicenza Calcio's pre-season camp, as the club had relegated and nearly failed to register for 2013–14 Lega Pro Prima Divisione.

Ancona
On 9 July 2014 he was signed by Ancona.

Südtirol
On 13 July 2015 he was signed by Südtirol in a 2-year contract.

Trapani
On 21 January 2020, his contract with Serie B club Trapani was terminated by mutual consent.

Serie C
On 21 January 2020 he signed a 1.5-year contract with Catanzaro in Serie C. On 5 October 2020 he moved to Feralpisalò.

On 31 August 2021, he joined to Fidelis Andria 2018. On 31 January 2023, Tulli was loaned by Imolese.

Notes

References

External links
 Lega Serie B Profile 
 Football.it Profile 
 

1987 births
Living people
People from Fermo
Sportspeople from the Province of Fermo
Footballers from Marche
Italian footballers
Association football forwards
Serie B players
Serie C players
Lega Pro Seconda Divisione players
Fermana F.C. players
A.S. Sambenedettese players
A.C. Mezzocorona players
L.R. Vicenza players
Rimini F.C. 1912 players
A.C. Cesena players
Pisa S.C. players
U.S. Ancona 1905 players
F.C. Südtirol players
S.S. Teramo Calcio players
Trapani Calcio players
U.S. Catanzaro 1929 players
FeralpiSalò players
S.S. Fidelis Andria 1928 players
Imolese Calcio 1919 players